The Meade LX200 is a family of commercial telescopes produced by Meade Instruments launched in 1992 with 8" (20.32 cm) and a 10" (25.4 cm) Schmidt–Cassegrain models on computerized altazimuth mounts. Two larger models, a 12" (30.48 cm) and a 16" (40.64 cm), quickly followed. The original version was later informally named the "classic" LX200 as newer upgraded versions replaced it. The first of these was the LX200GPS, which featured global positioning system electronics.  A  LX200GPS was later added to the line.

The advantage of the LX200 was price for its performance, which was accomplished by using electronics and software to equal the pointing performance of more expensive systems. Software and optical encoders corrected for errors, and the telescope also came with auto-guiding CCD and planetarium software.

A related series introduced in 2005 was the even higher end RCX400 (later renamed LX400-ACF), with new optics and a motorized focus/collimation system, and with upgraded fork mount electronics.  These were available in the same 8" (20.32 cm) to 16" (40.64) size range on the new fork mount, and the 16" (40.64 cm) optical tube assembly (OTA), along with a new 20" (50.8 cm) OTA, were available on a new German equatorial mount.  These were all f/8 optical systems, costing up to $50,000 for the 20" on the German equatorial mount.

An f/10 version of the new optics later replaced the optics of the existing LX200GPS fork mount models, with the new product line now called the LX200R (later renamed LX200-ACF).  The revised optics are called advanced coma free (ACF) after a lawsuit by Star Instruments and RC Optical Systems disallowed implying that they were based on Ritchey–Chrétien optics.

In September 2012, an amateur astronomer used an LX200GPS to record an impact on the planet Jupiter.

Installations
Selected observatories with LX200 telescopes.
Grupo de Dinâmica Orbital e Planetologia da UNESP de Guaratinguetá
Observatório da Universidade de Brasília at Universidade de Brasília
Observatorio de la Universidad Tecnológica de Pereira
Mount Wilson Observatory (prototype version)
Ball State University Observatory
Barus & Holley Observatory
Bayfordbury Observatory (University of Hertfordshire Observatory)
Bradstreet Observatory
 Campbelltown Rotary Observatory
California Polytechnic State University in San Luis Obispo
Chronos Observatory at Calamus Winery, Jordan, ON, Canada
Clavius Observatory, Universidad IberoAmericana, Mexico City, Mexico, www.clavius.astro.org.mx
Collins Observatory at Salem State University
Dodge City Community College
David Cole Observatory
Foothill Observatory (at Foothill College)
Frosty Drew Observatory
Givatayim Observatory
Olin Observatory at Gustavus Adolphus College
Hereford Arizona Observatory
Junk Bond Observatory
Letchworth & District Astronomical Society
Mead Observatory
AMJOCH Observatory at Michigan Technological University
Mount Albert Grammar School Observatory
Northumberland Astronomical Society
Nyrölä Observatory
Observatoire des Sciences de l'Univers de Grenoble
Observatorio Astronómico de Mallorca
Observatório Astronômico da UESC
Perth Observatory
Project Galileo
Red Barn Observatory
Rochester Institute of Technology
Science Education Observatory, Seoul National University, Seoul, South Korea
Shattuck Observatory
La Société Vaudoise des Sciences Naturelles - Lausanne, Switzerland
Starkenburg Observatory
Telus World of Science (Edmonton)
TUBITAK National Observatory
Van Vleck Observatory
West Yorkshire Astronomical Society
Widener University Observatory
Yale Student Observatory
York University Observatory
Universidad de Sonora, Mexico
Astronomical centre Rijeka
Saint Joseph Catholic School Student Observatory, Madison, Mississippi, USA
 Harold E. Taylor Observatory at the Richard Stockton State College of New Jersey
Observatoire du mont cosmos
Jiamusi University Observatory
John J. McCarthy Observatory

References

External links

Meade Instruments